Robert Field Stockton (August 20, 1795 – October 7, 1866) was a United States Navy commodore, notable in the capture of California during the Mexican–American War. He was a naval innovator and an early advocate for a propeller-driven, steam-powered navy.  Stockton was from a notable political family and also served as a U.S. senator from New Jersey.

Biography

Robert F. Stockton was born at Morven, Stockton Street, Princeton, New Jersey, into a political family; his father Richard Stockton was a U.S. senator and representative, and his grandfather, Judge Richard Stockton was attorney general for New Jersey and a signer of the Declaration of Independence.  Robert F. Stockton was of English descent, and his family had been in what is now the United States since the early colonial period. On March 4, 1823, he married Harriet Maria Potter in Charleston, South Carolina. Ten children were born to this marriage.

Early naval service
Stockton was appointed a midshipman in the U.S. Navy in September 1811, shortly after his 16th birthday, and served at sea and ashore during the War of 1812. After that conflict, Lieutenant Stockton was assigned to ships operating in the Mediterranean, in the Caribbean and off the coast of West Africa.  He was the first naval officer to act against the slave trade and captured several slave ships. In December of 1821, while commanding the U.S.S. Alligator along the African Windward Coast, Lt. Stockton along with Dr. Eli Ayers of the American Colonization Society, negotiated a treaty that led to the founding of the state of Liberia. One source describes that he "leveled a pistol at King Peter's head and thereby convinced the latter to sell some of his territory". Though this story of coercion is now being severely challenged by Smithsonian Magazine as being fraudulent propaganda with the recent discovery of the original contract, records, and contemporary press articles which show that Liberia was founded when "the two men [Ayers & Stockton] spent four days ashore negotiating a contract with local leaders to purchase a narrow tract of land that scholars estimate covered about 140 acres. Payment would come in the form of trade goods... together worth roughly $7,000 in today's money. Both parties also pledged to live in peace and friendship for ever. Ayers recorded the deal in careful script on the front and back of a single sheet of paper. He signed it along with Stockton and six local leaders, who referred to themselves as Peter, George, Zoda, Long Peter, Governor, and Jimmy. They were called "kings" in the contract, although they were not monarchs in the European sense... American Newspapers published accounts of the purchase and transcripts of the contract...". Fourteen years later, in 1835 the Contract, which had been brought to the U.S. under safekeeping of the American Colonization Society, mysteriously went missing and "over the ensuing decades that loss [of the original document] contributed to the myth that the contract had never existed at all - that the Americans had simply seized the land by force or fraud... Because Ayers kept a detailed journal of the 1821 journey to Cape Mesurado [now Liberia], and newspapers printed the text of the agreement, we now know much of what happened that December. But the absence of the original document left an enormous hole in the historical record". But that myth has been exploded by the August 2021 re-discovery of that Contract at the Chicago History Museum among the donated papers of Elias Caldwell, clerk for the Supreme Court during the tenure of George Washington's nephew Justice Bushrod Washington who was a co-founder of the American Colonization Society. The Contract hadn't gone mysteriously missing, it had merely been among the co-founder's papers and, while "out of sight/out of mind", it was forgotten.

Business affairs
During the later 1820s and into the 1830s, he primarily devoted his attention to business affairs in New Jersey. In addition, Stockton owned and operated the Tellurium gold mine in Goochland County, Virginia and Fluvanna County, Virginia, purchasing it in 1848, after its discovery in 1832 by G.W. Fisher. The birth of his son John P. Stockton, later also a U.S. senator representing New Jersey, occurred during this time.

In 1835, he purchased a property in Monmouth County, New Jersey, called "Sea Girt". The property was purchased in 1875 by a group of land developers, with the name of Stockton's estate ultimately leading to the choice of the name Sea Girt, New Jersey, when the borough was established in 1918.

Resumes active naval service
In 1838, Stockton resumed active naval service as a captain. He served in the European area, but took leave in 1840 to undertake political work. Offered the post of U.S. Secretary of the Navy by President John Tyler in 1841, he declined the offer, but worked successfully to gain support for the construction of an advanced steam warship with a battery of very heavy guns.

This ship became , the Navy's first screw-propelled steamer. The ship was designed by John Ericsson. Stockton commanded her when she was completed in 1843. The ship was armed with two long 225 pounder wrought iron guns, called the "Peacemaker" and the "Oregon". Although he was the deviser of the defective gun, Captain Stockton's political influence allowed him to be absolved of all responsibility for the February 1844 explosion of the gun, the Peacemaker, on board the ship. The explosion killed two cabinet secretaries and several others.

Cleared by the court of any wrongdoing in the explosion incident, Stockton was sent by President James K. Polk to Texas.  Stockton carried with him Polk's offer to annex Texas, sailing on the Princeton and arriving in Galveston. Stockton's observations while in Texas made him aware of the looming war with Mexico, a fact he communicated directly to Polk once he arrived back in Washington. No vessel during the Mexican war was more useful than the Princeton in the Gulf of Mexico. The records of the Navy Department showed she performed more service than all the rest of the Gulf squadron put together.

Mexican–American War
Conquest of California

On July 23, 1846, Commodore Stockton arrived in Monterey, California, and took over command from the ailing Commodore John D. Sloat of the Pacific Squadron of U.S. naval forces in the Pacific Ocean. Commodore Sloat had previously raised the US flag, without resistance, at Monterey, but had no plan to conduct any further military operations on shore and once relieved, sailed home to the United States, leaving Commodore Stockton in command of all US forces. He was the main driving force in continuing to take possession of Alta California.

On August 11, 1846, Commodore Stockton marched on Pueblo de Los Angeles to meet in battle with General Castro's army. Upon learning of the imminent arrival of Commodore Stockton, Castro retired, leaving behind all his artillery and made off in the direction of Sonora. Immediately after these events Stockton dispatched a courier, Kit Carson, to inform Washington of the proceedings and details of his conquest of California.

On December 6, 1846, Stockton learned that General Stephen Kearny had arrived in California with a small force and that he was besieged by vastly superior enemy forces at the Battle of San Pasqual. Kearny was among the wounded and in command of only 60 weary dragoons mounted on tired mules who were in a perilous position and under attack from a Californio-Mexican cavalry force under Andrés Pico. But for Commodore Stockton's immediate decision to take personal command of a relief column, the outcome could have been disastrous for Kearny.

Later, the combined forces consolidated control over San Diego, and in January 1847 won the minor skirmishes at the Battle of Rio San Gabriel and Battle of La Mesa taking back control of Los Angeles. Faced with the approximate 200 men under John C. Fremont's California Battalion as well as Stockton and Kearny's troops, the Californios sued for peace and signed the Treaty of Cahuenga, which ending fighting in Alta California. Stockton, as senior military authority and military governor of the occupied territory, authorized John C. Fremont's appointment to succeed him as military governor and commander of the California Battalion militia force. When General Kearny finally arrived with orders to assume control of the temporary government Stockton turned over control to Kearny.

Political pursuits
Stockton resigned from the Navy in May 1850 and returned to business and political pursuits. In 1851, he was elected as a Democrat from New Jersey to the United States Senate, where he sponsored a bill to abolish flogging as a Navy punishment. He resigned on January 10, 1853, to serve as president of the Delaware and Raritan Canal Company, a position he held until 1866.

He was a delegate to the unsuccessful Peace Conference of 1861  that attempted to settle the secession crisis; instead the American Civil War began later that year. In 1863, he was appointed to command the New Jersey militia when the Confederate Army invaded Pennsylvania. Stockton died at Princeton, New Jersey, in October 1866, and is buried in the Princeton Cemetery.

Legacy
Four U.S. Navy ships have been named  in his honor. The cities of Stockton, California and Stockton, Missouri are named in his honor, as is the borough of Stockton, New Jersey, Stockton Street in San Francisco, and Fort Stockton, San Diego, California, which is now a ruin, but was occupied during the Mexican–American War. In Mariposa County, California Stockton Creek is named after him due to a mine he owned in the California Gold Rush. In Liberia, Stockton Creek, a tidal channel that connects the Mesurado River and the Saint Paul River, and that separates Bushrod Island from the mainland in Monrovia, is also named for him.

Formerly Commodore Stockton Elementary School in San Francisco between Clay and Pacific Streets was named after him.
Stockton Street in San Jose was named after him and his Garden Alameda San Jose neighborhood.  In Sacramento, Stockton Boulevard is the historic thoroughfare linking Sacramento and Stockton, now superseded by Highway 99 and Interstate 5.

References

Bibliography

 Brockmann, R. John, (2009)  Commodore Robert F. Stockton, 1795-1866: Protean Man for a Protean Nation Cambria Press, Amherst, Massachusetts, p. 622. The only scholarly biography.  Url
 Beach, Edward Latimer. The United States Navy: A 200-year History. Houghton Mifflin Company. C 1986. pp. 196–221.

Further reading
 
 

1795 births
1866 deaths
People from Princeton, New Jersey
Stockton family of New Jersey
Democratic Party United States senators from New Jersey
American people of English descent
New Jersey Democrats
United States military governors of California
History of Liberia
People from Sea Girt, New Jersey
19th-century American politicians
United States Navy officers
United States Navy personnel of the Mexican–American War
People of the Conquest of California
American people of the Bear Flag Revolt
People of New Jersey in the American Civil War
Burials at Princeton Cemetery